is a Japanese comedian and actor.

Profile 
Together with his screen partner, Shinya Arino, Hamaguchi is part of the comic duo, Yoiko.

He is well known for his fishing skills learned while doing the variety show Ikinari Ougon Densetsu jp:いきなり!黄金伝説. Even though he has seasickness, he persevered and managed to catch all the special fish in the region required in the show. And whenever he was about to eat an item of seafood, he would always look up and give thanks for the food needed to sustain his strength. One of his favorite tag lines is "Tottadō!" when he finally attains something.

Hamaguchi has been dating Akina Minami, a gravure idol since 2014. They married each other in May, 2018.

Yoiko's Minecraft 
In yoiko's minecraft survival life (jp: よゐこのマイクラでサバイバル生活 hepburn: yoikono maikurade sabaibaru seikatsu) Hamaguchi's skin was alex and with his partner arino(steve) they both created a world named Two old dudes' island (jp: おっさん2にん じま　hepburn: ossan ninin jima). This world was arino's and hamaguchi joined that world.

See also
List of Japanese celebrities
List of Japanese people
jp:濱口優
jp:いきなり!黄金伝説。

References

大阪市立汎愛高等学校 
いきなり!黄金伝説 Ikinari Ougon Densetsu site

1972 births
Living people
Japanese comedians
People from Osaka
Japanese male actors